Karib'il Watar (Sabaean: ,;  7th century BCE), sometimes distinguished as  was probably the most important ruler of the early days of the Sabaean Kingdom. He is sometimes regarded as the founder of the kingdom proper, as he was responsible for changing the ruler's title from ("Mukarrib") to "king" (malik).

Name
The name Karibʾīl, variously transliterated, is probably Sabaean for "blessed by God" or "the god", in the case of the early Sabaeans usually referring to the moon god Almaqah. It may also mean "obedient to God" or "the god".

The name Watar is of uncertain meaning but appears in numerous regnal names in the area.

Life

Karib'il Watar, the son of Dhamar El Yanuf III who reigned in the early 7th century BCE, changed his title from Mukarrib to Malik. He is mentioned in one of the longest and most important Sabaean inscriptions which is located on the Great Temple of Almaqah in Sirwah 40 kilometers west of Marib.

The inscription in Sirwah which is composed of twenty lines describes the military campaigns led by Karib'il Watar. From the first line of the inscription, it seems the author was dazzled by his numerous extensive victories.

Karib'il started his campaigns by attacking western lands of Ma'rib, killing and capturing thousands of his enemies. Then he focused his attention on conquering of south-western sea ports and lands in order to weaken the Kingdom of Awsan.

He continued his advance to reach the lands of Awsan, which was controlling the southern regions up to shores of the Red Sea. Karib'il ordered his soldiers to shed their swords on Awsan's people, kill and capture thousands of them, and burn all their cities all the way to the sea.

Minaeans pose the next dangerous opponent. Therefore, he attacked their cities such as "Nestum" (Nasha'an) and burned them. Afterwards, he besieged the city of "Nescus" (Nashaq) for three years. The result of the siege was a humiliating defeat for Minaeans and the annexation of all their arable lands and dams, and a tribute have been imposed to the God Almaqah.

The last ever campaign was to north of Al Jawf near Najran. The outcome of the aggression was a landslide in which Karib'il killed five thousand, enslaved twelve thousand children, and seized more than two hundred thousand cattle.

Archaeology 
A number of smaller inscriptions tell us about Karib'il Watar include:
building inscriptions in the city walls of 'Araratum (today al-Asahil) and Katalum 50 km west-northwest of Marib, 
a showpiece from a temple on Jabal al-Laudh on the northeast edge of the Dschauf.
a stele, which marked Karib'ils property at fields near Marib.
two long reports (quoted as RES 3945 and RES 3946), which are located in the courtyard of Yada'il Dharih I built Almaqah Temple in Sirwah. 
The first text reports the construction of irrigation systems and military campaigns, 
the second of construction works and land acquired. Thus they give important insights both in Karib'il's politics and in the political situation in southern Arabia at that time.

See also
List of rulers of Saba and Himyar

Notes

External links
An inscription that describes military campaigns led by Karib'il Watar RES 3945, RES 3946.

References

Citations

Bibliography
 . 
 

Date of birth unknown
Date of death unknown
7th-century BC Yemeni people
Sabaeans
Mukaribs of Saba
Kings of Saba